Kosmos 421 ( meaning Cosmos 421), known before launch as DS-P1-Yu No.48, was a Soviet satellite which was launched in 1971 as part of the Dnepropetrovsk Sputnik programme. It was a  spacecraft, which was built by the Yuzhnoye Design Bureau, and was used as a radar calibration target for anti-ballistic missile tests.

Launch 
Kosmos 421 was successfully launched into low Earth orbit on 19 May 1971, with the rocket lifting-off at 10:20:00 UTC. The launch took place from Site 133/1 at the Plesetsk Cosmodrome, and used a Kosmos-2I 63SM carrier rocket.

Orbit 
Upon reaching orbit, it was assigned its Kosmos designation, and received the International Designator 1971-044A.

Kosmos 421 was the forty-second of seventy nine DS-P1-Yu satellites to be launched, and the thirty-eighth of seventy two to successfully reach orbit. It remained in orbit until it decayed and reentered the atmosphere on 8 November 1971.

See also

1971 in spaceflight

References

1971 in spaceflight
Kosmos satellites
Spacecraft launched in 1971
Dnepropetrovsk Sputnik program